Christian Philip Hollier Turner  (born 19 August 1972) is a British diplomat serving as Political Director of the Foreign, Commonwealth and Development Office since 2023. He previously served as British High Commissioner to Pakistan from 2019 to 2023.

Career 
After completing his PhD at the University of York and making historical television documentaries, Turner joined the Cabinet Office in 1997. He held positions in Private Office, the Economic and Domestic Secretariat and the Prime Minister's Strategy Unit.

Turner joined the Foreign, Commonwealth and Development Office in 2005 whilst First Secretary at the British Embassy Washington, DC. On his return to London he  served as Private Secretary to Prime Minister Gordon Brown in 2007; as Director Middle East and North Africa, 2009–2012 during the Arab Spring.

Turner served as High Commissioner to Kenya from 2012 to 2015. During his time in Kenya he led the UK response to the Westgate Mall terrorist attack and the UK's reconciliation with the MauMau.

On his return to the UK in 2016 Turner led the London Syria Conference for No 10, raising $12 billion for Syrian refugees. In 2016 he became Director General for the Middle East and Africa and then acting Political Director General. From 2017 to 2019 he served as Prime Minister Theresa May's international affairs advisor and Deputy National Security Advisor. In this role he was also senior responsible owner for the £1.25bn Conflict, Stability and Security Fund.

Turner was announced as High Commissioner to Pakistan in August 2019; he took office in December.

Honours 
Turner was appointed Companion of the Order of St Michael and St George (CMG) in the 2012 New Year Honours. Turner was made a Freeman of the City of London in 2019.

Personal life 
Turner is married with two children.

References

External links 
British High Commission in Pakistan
Christian Turner on Twitter

Living people
Principal Private Secretaries to the Secretary of State for Foreign and Commonwealth Affairs
High Commissioners of the United Kingdom to Pakistan
Companions of the Order of St Michael and St George
Date of birth missing (living people)
Place of birth missing (living people)
1972 births